The Smiths Singles Box is a limited edition box set compilation of 45 RPM 7-inch single releases by English rock band The Smiths. It contains repressings of the Smiths' first ten 7-inch singles released in the United Kingdom between May 1983 through May 1986, as well as the Dutch-only single for "The Headmaster Ritual" and the DJ promotional single of "Still Ill," housed in reproductions of their original picture sleeves. The box also includes a 14x14 poster of the single sleeves, four collector's pins and a download code for the mp3 versions. It was released on 8 December 2008 in the UK.

A compact disc version of the box set was issued on 22 June 2009 and featured a different track selection, largely reproducing the expanded track listings of the original 12-inch singles.

The cover of the box features actor Joel Fabiani, taken from the TV series Department S and selected by Smiths frontman Morrissey.

Track listing
All songs written by Morrissey/Johnny Marr

7" Version
7" 1
"Hand in Glove" - 3:16
"Handsome Devil" (Live) - 2:56
7" 2
"This Charming Man" - 2:43
"Jeane" - 3:04
7" 3
"What Difference Does It Make?" - 3:26
"Back to the Old House" - 3:05
7" 4
"Still Ill" - 3:22
"You've Got Everything Now" - 3:59
7" 5
"Heaven Knows I'm Miserable Now" - 3:36
"Suffer Little Children" - 5:27
7" 6
"William, It Was Really Nothing" - 2:11
"Please, Please, Please, Let Me Get What I Want" - 1:52
7" 7
"How Soon Is Now?" - 3:41
"Well I Wonder" - 4:00
7" 8
"Shakespeare's Sister" - 2:09
"What She Said" - 2:40
7" 9
"The Headmaster Ritual" - 4:54
"Oscillate Wildly" - 3:28
7" 10
"That Joke Isn't Funny Anymore" - 3:52
"Meat Is Murder" (Live) - 5:40
7" 11
"The Boy with the Thorn in His Side" - 3:18
"Asleep" - 4:10
7" 12
"Bigmouth Strikes Again" - 3:14
"Money Changes Everything" - 4:41

CD Version
CD 1
"Hand in Glove" - 3:17
"Handsome Devil" (Live) - 2:53

CD 2
"This Charming Man" (Manchester) - 2:42
"This Charming Man" (London) - 2:46
"Accept Yourself" - 3:58
"Wonderful Woman" - 3:08
"Jeane" - 3:02

CD 3
"This Charming Man" (New York Vocal) - 5:34
"This Charming Man" (New York Instrumental) - 4:18

CD 4
"What Difference Does It Make?" - 3:34
"Back to the Old House" - 3:04
"These Things Take Time" - 2:24

CD 5
"Heaven Knows I'm Miserable Now" - 3:34
"Girl Afraid" - 2:44 
"Suffer Little Children" - 5:27

CD 6
"William, It Was Really Nothing" - 2:10
"How Soon Is Now?" - 3:41
"Please, Please, Please, Let Me Get What I Want" - 1:50

CD 7
"How Soon Is Now?" - 6:43
"Well I Wonder" - 4:32
"Oscillate Wildly" - 3:26

CD 8
"Shakespeare's Sister" - 2:09
"What She Said" - 3:13
"Stretch Out and Wait" - 2:37

CD 9 
"Barbarism Begins at Home" - 3:49
"Shakespeare's Sister" - 2:09
"Stretch Out and Wait" - 2:37

CD 10
"That Joke Isn't Funny Anymore" - 4:57
"Nowhere Fast" (Live) - 2:31
"Stretch Out and Wait" (Live) - 2:49
"Shakespeare's Sister" (Live) - 2:12
"Meat Is Murder" (Live) - 5:34

CD 11
"The Boy with the Thorn in His Side" - 3:17
"Rubber Ring" - 3:55
"Asleep" - 4:10

CD 12
"Bigmouth Strikes Again" - 3:12
"Money Changes Everything" - 4:40
"Unloveable" - 3:54

References

The Smiths compilation albums
2008 compilation albums
Albums produced by Stephen Street
Rhino Records compilation albums